The 2007 Russian Super Cup was the 5th Russian Super Cup match, a football match which was to be contested between the 2006 Russian Premier League champion and the winner of 2005–06 Russian Cup. However, because the same team won both the league and the cup for the second consecutive season, the match was contested between the champion and the runner-up of the Russian Premier League, CSKA Moscow and Spartak Moscow, respectively, also for the second consecutive season. The match was held on 3 March 2007 at the Luzhniki Stadium in Moscow, Russia. CSKA Moscow beat Spartak Moscow 4–2 to win their third overall and second consecutive Russian Super Cup.

Match details

See also
2007 in Russian football
2006 Russian Premier League
2005–06 Russian Cup

External links
 Official stats

Super Cup
Russian Super Cup
Russian Super Cup 2007
Russian Super Cup 2007
March 2007 sports events in Europe
2007 in Moscow
Sports competitions in Moscow